Birmingham railway may refer to:

United Kingdom 

 Grand Junction Railway
 London and Birmingham Railway
 Manchester and Birmingham Railway
 Birmingham and Gloucester Railway
 Shrewsbury and Birmingham Railway
 Birmingham and Derby Junction Railway
 Birmingham West Suburban Railway
 Atlantic and Birmingham Railway
 Birmingham and Bristol Railway
 Atlanta, Birmingham and Atlantic Railway
 Birmingham and Oxford Junction Railway
 Birmingham Railway Carriage and Wagon Company

United States 

 Birmingham Terminal Railway
 Birmingham Street Railway
 Birmingham Railway and Electric Company
 Macon and Birmingham Railway
 Atlanta and Birmingham Air Line Railway

See also 

 Birmingham railway station (disambiguation)
 Transport in Birmingham (UK)